The Zoo Zürich is a zoo located in Zürich, Switzerland and together with the Basel Zoo is considered one of the best zoos in Europe. Opened in 1929, it is the third oldest zoo in Switzerland (after Basel and Arth-Goldau) and it accumulated a collection of 2,200 specimens of 300 species by its seventy-fifth year. It is located on Zürichbergstrasse, on the lower reaches of the Zürichberg in the Fluntern quarter.

One of its popular events is the penguin parade, which is performed daily after noon if the outside temperature is below ten degrees Celsius.

The zoologist Heini Hediger was director of the Zürich Zoo from 1954 to 1973. The current director is Severin Dressen. The zoo is member of WAZA and the EAZA.

The most famous attractions are the Asian elephant exhibit and Masoala Hall, which are inside of a large dome. Guests can even view elephants from underwater. They are also known as the only and first European institution to successfully breed Galápagos tortoises. Over the course of the years, the Zürich attraction has sent the baby tortoises to more than two dozen other zoos. In 2005 the zoo discovered that the seven lemurs caught in Andasibe thought to be mouse lemurs were actually a new species later named Goodman mouse lemur.

The zoo made international headlines in July 2020 when a Siberian tiger mauled a zookeeper to death in front of members of the public.

Masterplan 
In 1992 a new plan for the development of the zoo was presented. The area of the zoo was to be doubled by 2020, while keeping the number of species the same and redoing most of the enclosures. The goal was to shift the focus away from displaying animals towards displaying ecosystems, allowing animals to retreat into spaces hidden from visitors. To house these ecosystems - Eurasia, South America and Africa/Madagascar - the zoo was geographically divided into distinct zones.

An updated master plan serves as guideline even recently:

Already implemented and preexisting enclosures 

 (renovated 1989 and 2016) Exotarium - sea and freshwater fishes, penguins, reptiles and South American birds, mammals and amphibians.
 Evolution-themed house - Galápagos Tortoises
 Asian steppe and antelope house - zebras, Arabian Oryx and gazelles
 Great apes house - orangutans, Siamangs, gibbons and gorillas
 (1995) Sangay cloud forest - Spectacled Bears and Coati
 (1998) Selenga Eurasian wetlands - waterfowl
 (2003) Himalaya - Amur Tigers, Snow Leopards, Mongolian Wolves and Red Pandas
 (2002) Zoolino and nature workshop - children's zoo with farm animals and Bat World
 (2003) Masoala rainforest Hall (walkthrough) - Madagascian fauna and flora (Red-ruffed Lemurs, geckos, chameleons, etc.)
 (2006/2007) Gir dry forest - Indian Lions and Asian Small-clawed Otters
 (2008) Semien highlands - Gelada Baboons and Nubian Ibexes
 (2012) Pantanal wetlands - Lowland Tapirs, Giant Anteaters, capybaras, Squirrel Monkeys and Capuchin Monkeys
 (2014) Kaeng Krachan elephant park - Asian Elephants, blackbucks and Javan Mouse-deers
 (2015) Mongolian steppe - Bactrian Camels, yaks and Cashmere Goats
 (2018) Australia (previously Africa house) - koalas, wallabies, emus, Kookaburras, Lace Monitors and Lorikeets
 (2020) Lewa Savannah - giraffes, White rhinoceroses, Grévy's zebras, antelope, ostriches, hyenas and meerkats.

Further developments 

 Zoo aerial cableway
 New building for great apes
 New coastal ecosystem for seals, otters and sea birds
 Event location
 Asian steppe ecosystem for banteng and Arabian oryx

References

External links

Zoos in Switzerland
1929 establishments in Switzerland
Tourist attractions in Zürich
Buildings and structures in Zürich
Zoos established in 1929